The 2023 NHL Winter Classic was an outdoor ice hockey game played in the National Hockey League (NHL) on January 2, 2023, at Fenway Park in Boston. The 14th edition of the Winter Classic, it matched the Boston Bruins against the Pittsburgh Penguins; the Bruins won, 2–1.

Background
On February 4, 2022, the NHL announced that the 2023 NHL Winter Classic would take place at Fenway Park, hosted by the Boston Bruins. Fenway Park became the first venue to host two Winter Classics, having previously hosted the 2010 NHL Winter Classic.

ESPN reported in February 2022 that the Pittsburgh Penguins would likely be the opponent after Fenway Sports Group, owner of Fenway Park, took over majority control of the Penguins in December 2021. The league confirmed that it would be the Penguins on April 13.

The NHL moved the Winter Classic to Monday, January 2, as it had in 2012 and 2017, declining to hold the event on a Sunday. In addition, the game returned to its customary afternoon start time (2 p.m. EST).

Game summary

Number in parenthesis represents the player's total in goals or assists to that point of the season

Team rosters

Entertainment
Bell Biv DeVoe, accompanied by the Boston Pops Orchestra, performed the national anthem while the Black Keys performed during the first intermission. Country music artist Sam Hunt performed during pregame.

Broadcasting
The game was broadcast by TNT in the U.S. and Sportsnet in Canada. Warner Bros. Discovery Sports reported that the game was the most-watched regular season hockey game of all-time in the United States, averaging 1.8 million viewers throughout the broadcast and peaking at 2.1 million viewers toward the end of the game.

References

NHL Winter Classic
Winter Classic
NHL Winter Classic
NHL Winter Classic
Boston Bruins games
Pittsburgh Penguins games
Ice hockey competitions in Boston
2023 in Boston